Charles Frederick Humphrey (Jr.) (August 11, 1876 – January 22, 1968) was a career United States Army officer who served for over 40 years during the first half of the 20th century, retiring as a brigadier general in 1940 one year before the entry of the United States of America into World War II.

In his early career, as a first lieutenant, he received the Distinguished Service Cross for actions against insurgents in the Philippines on August 16, 1899. Primarily involved in training, he at one time or another trained and instructed such future legends as George S. Patton, Dwight D. Eisenhower, and Omar Bradley.  Appointed a Regular Army colonel in the 1920s, he was one of the top "career" officers in the establishment during a time when America's Army was badly underfunded and ranked 16th in the world.

Appointed a brigadier general in the 1930s, Humphrey commanded an infantry brigade and also did what he could to convince army leaders that America would almost certainly be involved in the next coming World War which, by 1935, was already obviously on the horizon with Nazi Germany and Imperial Japan.  Humphrey was a strong advocate of better training and equipment; thoughts which were also voiced by senior army leaders such as George C. Marshall and Douglas MacArthur.

In 1940, after nearly 42 years in uniform, Humphrey retired but was not called back during World War II as he was at this point over 65 years old.  He died in 1968 at Walter Reed Medical Center.

He was born into a military family.  His father, Major General Charles Frederic Humphrey Sr. was the first recipient of the Civil War Campaign Medal and also received the Medal of Honor and Distinguished Service Cross.  His brother was Brigadier General Evan Harris Humphrey, and another brother was Colonel Marion Bell Humphrey, USMC. He was married to Helen Kingsbury Humphrey (1880–1949).

Burial
Charles F. Humphrey Jr. is buried at Arlington National Cemetery near the grave of his father, MG Charles F. Humphrey Sr. (1844–1926).

References

External links
 Charles Frederick Humphrey, Jr. at ArlingtonCemetery.net, an unofficial website

1968 deaths
United States Army generals
United States Army personnel of World War I
1876 births
Quartermasters
Recipients of the Distinguished Service Cross (United States)
Burials at Arlington National Cemetery
Military personnel from Washington (state)
American military personnel of the Philippine–American War